Mohamed Ahmed Geisa (10 May 1913 – before 12 December 2003) was an Egyptian male weightlifter, who competed in the heavyweight class and represented Egypt at international competitions. He won the bronze medal at the 1946 and 1951 World Weightlifting Championships in the +90 kg category. He also competed in weightlifting at the 1936 Summer Olympics.

References

1913 births
Year of death missing
Egyptian male weightlifters
World Weightlifting Championships medalists
Place of birth missing
Olympic weightlifters of Egypt
Weightlifters at the 1936 Summer Olympics
20th-century Egyptian people